José Narciso da Cunha Rodrigues (born 1940) is a Portuguese jurist and judge at the European Court of Justice.

He held various offices within the judiciary between 1964 & 1977, including  Government assignments to carry out and coordinate studies on reform of the judicial system. He has also held the following positions since then:
 Government Agent at the European Commission of Human Rights and the European Court of Human Rights (1980–84).
 Expert on the Human Rights Steering Committee of the Council of Europe (1980–85).
 Member of the Review Commission for the Criminal Code and the Code of Criminal Procedure.
 Principal State Counsel (1984–2000).
 Member of the Supervisory Committee of the European Union Anti-Fraud Office (OLAF) (1999–2000).
 Judge at the Court of Justice since 7 October 2000.

See also

List of members of the European Court of Justice

References

1940 births
Living people
European Court of Justice judges
20th-century Portuguese lawyers
Portuguese judges of international courts and tribunals
21st-century Portuguese judges